The Jewish Defense Organization (JDO) was or is a militant Jewish self-defense organization in the United States. It is unclear if it is still functioning.

Background and ideology
The JDO was founded in the early 1980s by Mordechai Levy after a violent feud with the Jewish Defense League's former leader Irv Rubin, who was either killed or committed suicide in jail in 2002. It is one of two United States offshoots of the Jewish Defense League (JDL) after breaking with the JDL's former leader Meir Kahane.

According to the Anti-Defamation League, the JDO is a branch of Kahanism. The JDO opposes the ADL and believes that ADL head Abe Foxman obtained a pardon for Marc Rich after Rich made a contribution to the ADL. The Anti-Defamation League states that:

The Kahanist movement – comprising the Jewish Defense League (JDL) and the Jewish Defense Organization (JDO) in the United States, the Kach (Hebrew for "thus" or "this is the way") Party in Israel, and the Kahane Chai ("Kahane Lives") group, founded after Kahane's murder and operating both in Israel and in the U.S. – has spanned 26 years, reflecting a consistent agenda of hate, fear-mongering and intimidation. Rand Corporation terrorism authority Bruce Hoffman, notes that "terrorist organizations almost without exception now regularly select names for themselves that consciously eschew the word 'terrorism' in any of its forms." He cites the JDO as an example of an organisation that has chosen such a name.

Positions
The JDO is right-wing in its stance on Israeli defense and foreign policy issues. Its positions on issues of Jewish concern in the US are more nuanced, and it has criticized both right-wing and left-wing manifestations of what it sees as anti-Semitism and racism with equal rhetorical fervor.  It has worked with both left-wing and right-wing Jews on problems involving bigotry.  The JDO has targeted Jewish organizations that it deems to be insufficiently supportive of Zionism.

The JDO takes no stance on most domestic US issues unless they relate directly to anti-Semitism, or Zionism. An exception to this rule is gun control, which the group strongly opposes.

JDO campaigns 

The JDO's security team has occasionally patrolled Jewish neighborhoods in the aftermath of anti-Semitic incidents, and has urged other Jewish groups to do likewise. JDO members attempted to help provide security in Crown Heights during the 1991 Crown Heights Riot. The group has engaged in fights against neo-Nazis and white power skinheads in Las Vegas and other cities. It has also demonstrated, without incident, against Louis Farrakhan in New York City. The JDO often gives its demonstrations pseudo-military names, such as "Operation Klan Kicker" or "Operation Nazi Kicker"

In 2004, the JDO held rallies at an apartment house on Manhattan's Upper West Side, where a neo-Nazi activist and Holocaust denier ran his operation. In 1989, it launched a boycott of the rap group Public Enemy in response to allegedly anti-Semitic remarks by Professor Griff, its self-styled Minister of Information. As a result of the media controversy, Griff temporarily left the band, and Public Enemy apologized for his remarks.

The JDO has adopted a tactic of pressuring hotels and other public facilities to cancel meetings sponsored by anti-Semites such as David Duke. In early 2004, the JDO waged a phone-in campaign to pressure a Florida company to remove billboard messages sponsored by the National Alliance, an organization widely regarded as neo-Nazi. In September 2006 Columbia University scrapped plans for an address by Iranian President Mahmoud Ahmadinejad because of security and logistical problems. The move came as the JDO expressed outrage that the hard-line leader had been invited to speak.

In late 2006 the JDO initiated Operation Screwball, aimed at the small Haredi Jewish group Neturei Karta. In 2007, the JDO helped organize a demonstration in which several hundred Orthodox Jews protested against Neturei Karta, some of whose members had been attending a Holocaust denial conference in Iran. The protesters shouted "Nazi traitors! Go back to Iran! You are killing Jews!" at members of Neturei Karta in the Rockland County community of Monsey. On January 14, 2007, 200 JDO members and sympathizers gathered outside a Brooklyn hotel to protest the presence of Moshe Aryeh Friedman, an anti-Israel rabbi who spoke at a Holocaust-denial conference in Iran.

In June 2007, New York City Police investigated the JDO after it plastered fliers over Brooklyn Councilman Charles Barron's office, calling him an anti-Semite for voting for a defeated proposal to name a street after controversial black nationalist activist Sonny Carson.

Allegations of fueling racial unrest
Levy and the JDO's involvement led to accusations that the group inflamed divisions at Rutgers University in 1995, where African American students had protested against comments made by then-President Francis L. Lawrence that were perceived as anti-Black.  The JDO accused the protesting black students of themselves being racist and anti-Semitic. Levy's involvement was met with apprehension by some members of the Rutgers Jewish community.  Rabbi Norman Weitzner of Rutgers Hillel felt there was no anti-Semitism involved and noted "The JDO sees anti-Semitism at the drop of a hat, when it may not actually exist." The interim director of Rutgers Hillel said at the time that Levy "thinks he's going to wake up the Jewish students. What's going to happen is that he's going to start a racial war."

Mordechai Levy

Mark "Mordechai" Levy is the founder and leader of the JDO, and the only JDO member to receive substantial notice in the press. He spends much of his time promoting the JDO's Camp Jabotinsky, which provides self-defense and gun training for young Jews at a facility in the Catskills. Levy is an avid follower of Vladimir Jabotinsky, after whom the camp is named, and often repeats Jabotinsky's motto: "Better to know how to shoot and not need to, than to need to and not know how."

According to the Anti-Defamation League, Levy had an antagonistic relationship with Irv Rubin of the Jewish Defense League. The two of them nearly came to blows during a Los Angeles press conference in 1989, and  later that year Levy was charged with four counts of attempted murder, one count of first-degree assault, and one count of criminal possession of a deadly weapon after shooting at Rubin from a rooftop in New York City. Rubin was attempting to serve Levy with a subpoena in a slander suit. The rooftop was that of the apartment dwelling of JDO activist A. J. Weberman, also known for his activism in the Youth International Party (Yippies). Levy and Weberman, along with JDO, were successfully sued for libel more recently and fined $850,000. Levy was acquitted of all charges except one count of felony assault with a deadly weapon, for which he served 18 months of a 4½ year sentence.

Levy pleaded guilty in 2000 to unrelated charges of assaulting a 12-year-old boy in New York State after the boy attempted to set fire to a hotel where the JDO was holding a meeting.

See also
 Meir Kahane
 Golus nationalism

Footnotes

External links
 Jewish Defense Organization website
 Guide to the Records of the Jewish Defense Organization at the American Jewish Historical Society, NY

Anti-Arabism in North America
Jewish-American political organizations
Zionism in the United States
Kahanism
Organizations established in the 1980s
1980s establishments in the United States